John Leslie Hotson, (16 August 1897 – 16 November 1992) was a scholar of Elizabethan literary puzzles.

Biography
He was born at Delhi, Ontario, on 16 August 1897. He studied at Harvard University, where he obtained a B.A., M.A. and Ph.D. He went on to hold a number of academic posts.

Hotson was known for his tenacious archival research and his interest in coded information. He had a number of notable successes, but not all of his "decodings" have been accepted by other scholars. He discovered the identity of Ingram Frizer, the killer of Christopher Marlowe, and reconstructed the shape of the original Shakespearean theater. He also unearthed the letters that Percy Bysshe Shelley wrote to his divorced wife Harriet; produced evidence of Shakespeare's father as a wool dealer; illuminated Shakespeare's early years in Stratford-upon-Avon; and identified John Day as the killer of Henry Porter, a minor Elizabethan dramatist.

Some of his solutions to literary puzzles are still in dispute. He claimed to have identified one Nicholas Colfox as the murderer of Thomas of Woodstock by "decoding" Chaucer's The Nun's Priest's Tale. He also claimed to have identified Mr W H, the person to whom Shakespeare's sonnets were dedicated, as a William Hatcliffe of Lincolnshire. He later argued that a miniature colour portrait by Nicholas Hilliard depicted Shakespeare as a young man. As the New York Times stated in his obituary: "it was chiefly as a Shakespearian detective that Dr Hotson remained in the public eye, sometimes to the annoyance of rival scholars who discounted his theories."

His first major work, The Death of Christopher Marlowe — which made his name — is still in print. He stumbled across the evidence while decoding Chaucer's Nun's Priest's Tale in the archives of the English Public Records Office in 1923–24.

He died on 16 November 1992 in North Branford, Connecticut.

Life summary
 Pacifist - served with Friends (Quaker) Relief Unit in France, 1918–1919
 Educated at Harvard (BA, MA, PhD) and Yale
 Married 1919, Mary May Peabody
 Fulbright Exchange Scholar at Bedford College, London
 Taught at Harvard, Yale (Research Associate) and New York University
 Guggenheim Fellow 1929 and 1930 in 16th and 17th Century English Literature
 Taught at Haverford College (1931–42)
 Second War – Officer in Signal Corps
 Fellow of King's College, Cambridge (England), 1954–60
 He is the author of many books of literary biography, criticism and detection, such as:
 Colfox vs Chauntecleer 1924 PMLA XXXIX
 The Death of Christopher Marlowe 1925
 The Commonwealth and Restoration Stage 1929
 Shakespeare versus Shallow 1931
 The Adventure of a Single Rapier 1931
 I, William Shakespeare
 Shakespeare's Sonnets Dated
 Shakespeare's Motley
 The First Night of Twelfth Night, 1954
 Shakespeare's Wooden O, 1959
 Mr WH, 1964
 Shakespeare by Hilliard, 1977

Footnotes

1897 births
1992 deaths
Harvard University alumni
Shakespearean scholars
Canadian literary critics
Yale University faculty
Harvard University faculty
New York University faculty
People from Norfolk County, Ontario
Historians of theatre
Alumni of Bedford College, London
Canadian emigrants to the United States